Nora Mebarek (born 22 July 1972) is a French politician of the Socialist Party (PS) who has been a Member of the European Parliament since February 2020.

Political career 
Mebarek stood in the 2017 French legislative election in Bouches-du-Rhône's 16th constituency, a seat with an incumbent socialist MP, Michel Vauzelle, who was standing down. She came in 5th place on the first round and was eliminated. The seat was won in the second round by Monica Michel from La République En Marche!.

Mebarek stood in the 2019 European Parliament election in France. She was placed 6th on the PS–PP–ND list, and so was not elected immediately but secured a seat among the British seats that were redistributed after the UK left the European Union. She took her seat in the European Parliament after Brexit. She sits with the Progressive Alliance of Socialists and Democrats.

In parliament, Mebarek serves on the Committee on Regional Development. Since 2021, she has been part of the Parliament's delegation to the Conference on the Future of Europe. In addition to her committee assignments, she is part of the Parliament’s delegation for relations with the Mashreq countries.

Ahead of the 2022 presidential elections, Mebarek publicly declared her support for Anne Hidalgo as the Socialists’ candidate and joined her campaign team.

Political positions
In May 2021, Mebarek joined a group of 39 mostly Green Party lawmakers from the European Parliament who in a letter urged the leaders of Germany, France and Italy not to support Arctic LNG 2, a $21 billion Russian Arctic liquefied natural gas (LNG) project, due to climate change concerns.

See also 
 List of members of the European Parliament for France, 2019–2024

References

External links 
 Biography at the European Parliament

Living people
1972 births
21st-century French women politicians
21st-century French politicians
People from Bouches-du-Rhône
French socialists
MEPs for France 2019–2024
Socialist Party (France) MEPs
21st-century women MEPs for France
Politicians from Provence-Alpes-Côte d'Azur